The 1962 Dutch Grand Prix was the eleventh time the Dutch Grand Prix (or Grote Prijs van Nederland) motor race was held. The race also held the honorary designation of the 22nd European Grand Prix. It was run to Formula One regulations on 20 May 1962 as race 1 of 9 in both the 1962 World Championship of Drivers and the 1962 International Cup for Formula One Manufacturers. It was held over 80 laps of the compact 2.6 mile Circuit Park Zandvoort for a race distance of just over 200 miles.

It was won by British driver Graham Hill driving a BRM P57. It was the first Grand Prix victory for the future dual-World Champion and the second time a BRM driver had won the race after Jo Bonnier in 1959. Hill finished over 27 seconds ahead of Team Lotus driver Trevor Taylor driving a Lotus 24. The reigning World Champion, Ferrari's Phil Hill (Ferrari 156) completed the podium.

The race provided an indication of the season to come as the long-maligned British Racing Motors organisation were on their way to their first and ultimately only constructor's championship. It also signalled Hill's own rise in the sport, having only stood on the podium once before, at the same circuit two years previously. He would win three more races this year and be crowned World Champion.

Classification

Qualifying

Race

Championship standings after the race

Drivers' Championship standings

Constructors' Championship standings

 Notes: Only the top five positions are included for both sets of standings.

References

Dutch Grand Prix
Dutch Grand Prix
European Grand Prix
Grand Prix
Dutch Grand Prix